Kurt Hager (24 July 1912 – 18 September 1998) was an East German statesman, a member of the Socialist Unity Party of Germany who was known as the chief ideologist of the party and decided many cultural and educational policies in the German Democratic Republic.

Life
Hager was born in Bietigheim, Württemberg, on July 24th, 1912, the son of a labourer and a cleaner. After attending primary and secondary school he passed the high school exam (Abitur) in 1931. He was a member of the YMCA and Socialist Student Union. Hager worked as a journalist and joined the KPD in 1930, and the Roter Frontkämpferbund in 1932. In 1933 he took part in a sabotage of Hitler's first speech on the radio. Hager was arrested and sent to the concentration camp Lager Heuberg. After a brief period of detention, he emigrated in 1936.

Until 1937, he worked as a courier for the Young Communist League of Germany in Switzerland, France and Czechoslovakia.

In 1939 he was detained in France and then emigrated to England. There he was responsible for the international organization of the KPD active, writing under the pseudonym "Felix Albin". After the outbreak of war, he was interned, first in an internment camp at Huyton near Liverpool, and later on the Isle of Man.

East Germany

In 1945 Hager returned to Berlin. Until 1946 he first worked as forestry worker and welder, and later as a journalist for the magazine "Freie Tribüne".

Upon his return, he was deputy chief editor of "Vorwarts", the Monday edition of Neues Deutschland. In 1948, Hager graduated the Parteihochschule "Karl Marx", qualifying him to be a lecturer. In 1949 he became a full professor for philosophy at the Humboldt University in Berlin.

In 1946 he joined the SED, and became head of the party Training Division, then in 1949 the Head of the Propaganda Department. From 1952 he became the Head of the Science Division of the Code of SED, and from 1954 a member of the Central Committee of the SED. In 1955 he became the secretary, and was responsible for science, popular education and culture. A candidate in 1959, from 1963 he was a Member of the Politburo of the CC of SED and the Ideology committee of the Politburo. In 1958 he became a member of the Public Chamber and 1967 was made chairman of the Public Education Committee. He was also between 1976-1989 a Member of the Council of State and between 1979-1989 a member of the National Defense Council. In the SED-Politbüro Hager was "Chefideologe" and ultimately responsible for culture.

In speeches and writings Hager denied the existence of a single German cultural nation and a common German history. In 1987, in an interview with the German magazine Stern about the reforms of Mikhail Gorbachev in the Soviet Union, Hager gave the answer: "Would you, if your neighbor repapers his apartment, feel like you should also repaper your apartment?". This rejection of the policy of glasnost and perestroika of the Soviet military power met an angry reception both in the party base, as well as in the population of the GDR. Wolf Biermann titled Hager - probably due to this occasion, in his song "The Ballad of the corrupt old men" scornfully as "Professor Tapeten-Kutte". In a spontaneous encounter with GDR-journalists - when they came into his residence, the "Wachobjekt Wandlitz", for the first time - Hager said he was placed there against his will at the climax of the Cold War. It had "bent the decisions of the party," said Hager in the presence of his wife. Wandlitz, which after 1989 became the epitome of the duplicity of DDR-Oberen made a name for himself had he described as its seventh internment camp, in which he had come.

In November 1989 Hager was removed from his functions, and in 1990 expelled from the SED-PDS.

Hager won numerous awards. He received 1956 Hans-Beimler-Medaille, 1962 Banner of Labor, 1964 Vaterländischer Verdienstorden, 1969 entitled Hero of Labour, as well as 1972, 1977 and 1982 Order of Karl Marx.

His daughter Nina Hager, joined somewhat in the footsteps of her father. She is vice chairman of the German Communist Party (DKP), a member of the National Executive and there are other positions.

Hager died in Berlin in 1998. His grave is located on the Zentralfriedhof Friedrichsfelde.

References

1912 births
1998 deaths
People from Bietigheim-Bissingen
People from the Kingdom of Württemberg
Communist Party of Germany politicians
Members of the Politburo of the Central Committee of the Socialist Unity Party of Germany
German Communist Party politicians
Members of the State Council of East Germany
Members of the 3rd Volkskammer
Members of the 4th Volkskammer
Members of the 5th Volkskammer
Members of the 6th Volkskammer
Members of the 7th Volkskammer
Members of the 8th Volkskammer
Members of the 9th Volkskammer
Rotfrontkämpferbund members
German people of the Spanish Civil War
People interned in the Isle of Man during World War II
Recipients of the Banner of Labor
Recipients of the Order of Friendship of Peoples
Recipients of the Order of the Red Banner of Labour
Recipients of the Patriotic Order of Merit in gold
Recipients of the Patriotic Order of Merit in silver